Superinsulation is an approach to building design, construction, and retrofitting that dramatically reduces heat loss (and gain) by using much higher levels of insulation and airtightness than normal. Superinsulation is one of the ancestors of the passive house approach.

Definition
There is no universally agreed definition of superinsulation, but superinsulated buildings typically include:
 Very high levels of insulation, typically R-40 (RSI-7) walls and R-60 (RSI-10.6) roof, corresponding to SI U-values of 0.15 and 0.1 W/(m²·K) respectively)
 Details to ensure insulation continuity where walls meet roofs, foundations, and other walls
 Airtight construction, especially around doors and windows to prevent air infiltration pushing heat in or out
 a heat recovery ventilation system to provide fresh air
 No large windows facing any particular direction
 Much smaller than conventional heating system, sometimes just a small backup heater

Nisson & Dutt (1985) suggest that a house might be described as "superinsulated" if the cost of space heating is lower than the cost of water heating.

Beside the above mentioned meaning of high level of insulation, the terms superinsulation and superinsulating materials is in use for high R/inch insulation material like vacuum insulation panels (VIPs) and aerogel.

Theory
A superinsulated house is intended to reduce heating needs very significantly and may even be heated predominantly by intrinsic heat sources (waste heat generated by appliances and the body heat of the occupants) with very small amounts of backup heat. This has been demonstrated to work even in very cold climates but requires close attention to construction details in addition to the insulation (see IEA Solar Heating & Cooling Implementing Agreement Task 13).

History 
The term "superinsulation" was coined by Wayne Schick at the University of Illinois Urbana–Champaign. In 1976 he was part of a team that developed a design called the "Lo-Cal" house, using computer simulations based on the climate of Madison, Wisconsin. Several houses, duplexes and condominiums based on Lo-Cal principles were built in Champaign–Urbana in the 1970s.

In 1977 the "Saskatchewan House" was built in Regina, Saskatchewan, by a group of Canadian government agencies. It was the first house to publicly demonstrate the value of superinsulation and generated a lot of attention. It originally included some experimental evacuated-tube solar panels, but they were not needed and were later removed. The house was heated primarily by waste heat from appliances and the occupants. In 1977 the "Leger House" was built by Eugene Leger, in East Pepperell, Massachusetts. It had a more conventional appearance than the "Saskatchewan House", and also received extensive publicity. Publicity from the "Saskatchewan House" and the "Leger House" influenced other builders, and many superinsulated houses were built over the next few years. These houses also influenced Wolfgang Feist when he developed the Passivhaus standard.

Retrofits
It is possible, and increasingly desirable, to retrofit superinsulation to existing houses or buildings. The easiest way is often to add layers of continuous rigid exterior insulation, and sometimes by building new exterior walls that allow more space for insulation. A vapor barrier can be installed on the outside of the original framing but may not be needed. An improved continuous air barrier is almost always worth adding, as older homes tend to be drafty, and such an air barrier can be important for energy savings and durability. Care should be exercised when adding a vapor barrier as it can reduce drying of incidental moisture or even cause summer (in climates with humid summers) interstitial condensation and consequent mold and mildew. This may cause health problems for the occupants and may damage the structure. Many builders in northern Canada use a simple 1/3 to 2/3 approach, placing the vapor barrier no further out than 1/3 of the R-value of the insulated portion of the wall. This method is generally valid for interior walls that have little or no vapor resistance (e.g., they use fibrous insulation) and controls air leakage condensation as well as vapor diffusion condensation. This approach will ensure that condensation does not occur on or to the inside of the vapor barrier during cold weather. The 1/3:2/3 rule will ensure that the vapor barrier temperature will not fall below the dew point temperature of the interior air and will minimize the possibility of cold-weather condensation problems. 

For example, with an internal room temperature of 20 °C (68 °F), the vapor barrier will then only reach 7.3 °C (45 °F) when the outside temperature is at −18 °C (−1 °F). Indoor air dew point temperatures are more likely to be in the order of around 0 °C (32 °F) when it is that cold outdoors, much lower than the predicted vapor barrier temperature, and hence the 1/3:2/3 rules is quite conservative. For climates that do not often experience −18 °C, the 1/3:2/3 rule should be amended to 40:60 or 50:50. As the interior air dewpoint temperature is an important basis for such rules, buildings with high interior humidities during cold weather (e.g., museums, swimming pools, humidified or poorly ventilated airtight homes) may require different rules, as can buildings with drier interior environments (e.g., highly ventilated buildings and warehouses). The 2009 International Residential Code embodies more sophisticated rules to guide the choice of insulation on the exterior of new homes, which can be applied when retrofitting older homes.

A vapor permeable building wrap on the outside of the original wall helps keep the wind out allows the wall assembly to dry to the exterior. Asphalt felt and other products such as permeable polymer based products are available for this purpose, and usually double as the water resistant barrier / drainage plane as well.

Interior retrofits are possible where the owner wants to preserve the old exterior siding, or where setback requirements limit space for an exterior retrofit. Sealing the air barrier is more difficult and the thermal insulation continuity compromised (because of the many partition, floor, and service penetrations), the original wall assembly is rendered colder in cold weather (and hence more prone to condensation and slower to dry), occupants are exposed to major disruptions, and the house is left with less interior space. Another approach is to use the 1/3 to 2/3 method mentioned above—that is, to install a vapor retarder on the inside of the existing wall (if there is not one there already) and add insulation and support structure to the inside. This way, utilities (power, telephone, cable, and plumbing) can be added in the new wall space without penetrating the air barrier. Polyethylene vapor barriers are risky except in very cold climates, because they limit the wall's ability to dry to the interior. This approach also limits the amount of interior insulation that can be added to a rather small amount (e.g., only R-6 insulation can be added to a 2×4 R-12 wall).

Costs and benefits
In new construction, the cost of the extra insulation and wall framing may be offset by not requiring a dedicated central heating system. In homes with numerous rooms, more than one floor, air conditioning or large sized, a central furnace is often justified or required to ensure sufficiently uniform temperatures. Small furnaces are not very expensive, and some ductwork to every room is generally required to provide ventilation air in any case. When peak demand and annual energy use is low, sophisticated and expensive central heating systems are not often required. Hence, even electric resistance heaters may be used. Electric heaters are typically only used on the coldest winter nights when overall demand for electricity in the rest of the house is low. Other forms of backup heater are widely used, such as wood pellets, wood stoves, natural gas boilers or even furnaces. The cost of a superinsulation retrofit should be balanced against the future cost of heating fuel (which can be expected to fluctuate from year to year due to supply problems, natural disasters or geopolitical events), the desire to reduce pollution from heating a building, or the desire to provide exceptional thermal comfort.

During a power failure, a superinsulated house stays warm longer as heat loss is much less than normal, but the thermal storage capacity of the structural materials and contents is the same. Adverse weather may hamper efforts to restore power, leading to outages lasting a week or more. When deprived of their continuous supply of electricity (either for heat directly, or to operate gas-fired furnaces), conventional houses cool rapidly and may be at greater risk of costly damage from freezing water pipes. Residents who use supplemental heating methods without proper care during such episodes, or at any other time, may subject themselves to risk of fire or carbon monoxide poisoning.

See also

The first superinsulated houses used standard stud-wall construction, but other building techniques can be used:
Building insulation materials
Building insulation
Earth-sheltered
Earthship
Energy conservation
Insulating concrete form (ICF)
Quadruple glazing
Seasonal thermal energy storage (STES)
Straw-bale construction
Structural insulated panel (SIP)
Zero-energy building

Notes

References

Computation and description of an outside insulation house: To build for tomorrow (translated from French)
Booth, Don, Sun/Earth Buffering and Superinsulation, 1983, 
Marshall, Brian; and Robert Argue, The Super-Insulated Retrofit Book, Renewable Energy in Canada, 1981 , 
Shurcliff, William A., Superinsulated houses: A survey of principles and practice, Brick House Pub. Co, 1981, 1982 
Shurcliff, William A., Superinsulated Houses and Air-To-Air Heat Exchangers, Brick House Pub Co, 1988,

External links
Joe Lstiburek's 10-20-40-60 rule
Optimization of the Building Shell with Superinsulation
Super-Insulated House Plans (Mother Earth News)
Why Superinsulation is so important in building to passive house standard
Drawings and specs of 12 different superinsulated wall assemblies
Superinsulation retrofit of a 1915 Sears Roebuck house
Resources on the History of Superinsulation

Building biology
Building engineering
Energy conservation
Environmental design
Heating, ventilation, and air conditioning
Low-energy building
Sustainable technologies
Thermal protection
Sustainable building